Groton Wind Power Project a 48-megawatt wind farm, also known as Groton Wind Farm was constructed in 2012 in Groton, New Hampshire in the northeast United States. Owned by Iberdrola Renovables, it is the third major wind-power installation in the state of New Hampshire. Power is being sold to NSTAR under a power purchase agreement, and will go to the Boston area.

Located on Tenney Mountain and Fletcher Mountain in Groton, in Grafton County, it has 24 Gamesa G87, 2.0 MW turbines wind turbines. Delivery of turbine components began on June 25, 2012, and continued through August.

References

External links

 Groton Wind Farm

Energy infrastructure completed in 2012
Buildings and structures in Grafton County, New Hampshire
Wind farms in New Hampshire